This is a list of notable Hindi television actresses.

Hindi television actresses

See also
List of Indian television actresses
List of Hindi film actresses

References

Hindi television content related lists 
 
television actresses
Actresses in Hindi television